In computer science, bidirectionalization refers to the process of given a source-to-view transformation (automatically) finding a mapping from the original source and an updated view to an updated source.

See also 
 Bidirectional transformation
 Inverse function
 Reversible computing
 View (database)

Further reading 
 Janis Voigtländer, Zhenjiang Hu, Kazutaka Matsuda, and Meng Wang. Combining Syntactic and Semantic Bidirectionalization. International Conference on Functional Programming 2010. 

Database management systems
Database theory